James Gibson (March 2, 1896 – May 28, 1964) was a Canadian professional ice hockey player. He played with the Calgary Tigers of the Western Canada Hockey League. He also played for the Victoria Cougars of the Pacific Coast Hockey Association.

Prior to becoming a professional Gibson played amateur and senior ice hockey in Winnipeg.

References

Notes

External links

1896 births
1964 deaths
Calgary Tigers players
Ice hockey people from Ontario
Sportspeople from Kenora
Victoria Cougars (1911–1926) players
Canadian ice hockey centres